Piterka is the name of several rural localities in Russia:
Piterka (railway station), Saratov Oblast, a railway station in Pitersky District, Saratov Oblast
Piterka (selo), Saratov Oblast, a selo in Pitersky District, Saratov Oblast
Piterka, Tambov Oblast, a selo in Piterkovsky Selsoviet of Morshansky District of Tambov Oblast